is a Japanese former football player and manager. His younger brother Nobuyuki is also a former footballer.

Playing career
Zaizen was born in Muroran on June 17, 1968. After graduating from high school, he joined Nissan Motors in 1987. However he could hardly play in the match. He also played for Japan Football League club Kashiwa Reysol (1994) and Consadole Sapporo (1996). He retired end of 1996 season.

Coaching career
After retirement, Zaizen started coaching career at Consadole Sapporo in 1997. He mainly coached for youth team until 2009. In 2010, he moved to Avispa Fukuoka and mainly managed youth team until 2012. In 2013, he returned to Consadole and he became a manager for top team. However he was sacked in August 2014.

Club statistics

Managerial statistics

References

External links
 
 
 

1968 births
Living people
Association football people from Hokkaido
Japanese footballers
Japan Soccer League players
J1 League players
Japan Football League (1992–1998) players
Yokohama F. Marinos players
Kashiwa Reysol players
Hokkaido Consadole Sapporo players
Japanese football managers
J2 League managers
Hokkaido Consadole Sapporo managers
Association football midfielders
People from Muroran, Hokkaido